Wakaw Airport  is located adjacent to Wakaw, Saskatchewan, Canada.

See also 
 List of airports in Saskatchewan

References 

Registered aerodromes in Saskatchewan
Fish Creek No. 402, Saskatchewan